Charles Edward (Mallard) Haughton (1827 – 16 April 1904) was a 19th-century Member of Parliament in Otago, New Zealand.

He represented the Goldfields electorate from the 1865 by-election to 1866, then the Hampden electorate from 1866 to 1870, then the Wakatipu electorate in 1871, until he resigned.

He was born in New South Wales and educated at Oxford, becoming an Anglican naval chaplain (and later converted to Catholicism). He was on the Otago Provincial Council from 1865 to 1872, and then in the New Zealand Parliament he was an undersecretary and whip. He was then a journalist on the Wellington Independent, then the Dunedin Evening Star for 30 years. He died in Dunedin.

References

1827 births
1904 deaths
Members of the New Zealand House of Representatives
New Zealand MPs for South Island electorates
19th-century New Zealand politicians
19th-century New Zealand journalists
Australian emigrants to New Zealand
Members of the Otago Provincial Council
People of the Otago Gold Rush